Vincent Anthony Crisostomo (born February 6, 1961 in Tachikawa, Japan) is a gay HIV AIDS activist of Chamorro descent from Guam. He was diagnosed with AIDS in 1995. He currently serves as Director of Aging Services at the San Francisco AIDS Foundation (SFAF) previously he served as Program Manager of SFAF's Elizabeth Taylor 50-Plus Network at the San Francisco AIDS Foundation.

Personal life 
Crisostomo grew up Catholic in a religious family. He attended church frequently and was an altar boy as well as a member of the church choir. While the church provided a sense of community, it also promoted intolerance of homosexuality. Eventually, this prompted Crisostomo to leave the church and his home.

Crisostomo met his partner Jesse Solomon in 1988 in New York City. Solomon was a physical therapist who worked with severely disabled children as well as a personal trainer and yoga teacher. They moved to San Francisco in 1990 and were one of the first 50 same-sex couples to register at the San Francisco City Hall. Solomon passed on October 6, 1991 of HIV/AIDS.

HIV/AIDS Work

Volunteering in New York City 
Crisostomo began doing HIV AIDS work in 1985 when he was in New York City. One of his jobs was at a club where many patrons began falling sick. He volunteered to do hospital visits for the terminally ill HIV/AIDS patients. Crisostomo himself contracted HIV in 1987 and was diagnosed with AIDS in 1995.

GAPA Community HIV Project and Asian AIDS Project 
In 1992, Crisostomo became an HIV AIDS educator in the Asian Pacific Islanders LGBTQ community through the GAPA Community HIV Project (GCHP) and the Asian AIDS Project, which later merged to become the API Wellness Center. Guam's World AIDS day in 1992 was also the day that Crisostomo became the first Chamorro to publicly come out as living with AIDS. He continued to travel back to Guam and the Pacific area to provide assistance on HIV AIDS capacity building and service provision.

Coral Life Foundation 
In 2001, Crisostomo moved from San Francisco to Guam to become the Executive Director of the Coral Life Foundation, a community-based organization working on HIV AIDS in the Asia-Pacific Area. Coral Life Foundation was the first NGO in the area to work on HIV AIDS. In that capacity, Crisostomo convened representatives from the six Pacific Island Jurisdictions which included AIDS directors, program staff, community stakeholders, along with capacity-building assistance providers funded by the Center for Disease Control (CDC) to discuss the state of HIV prevention and care services in their respective jurisdictions. From these discussions PIJAAG was formed to advocate for the provision of quality HIV prevention and care services and to advise national, international, and local policy entities on HIV AIDS issues within the region. Under Crisostomo's leadership, PIJAAG successful advocacy led to a $600,000 increase in the region's HIV Prevention budget, funding of 3 Planning Grants for Care Services and baseline awards for services to those living with HIV. The Coral Life Foundation closed in 2002 and was replaced with GuaHAN Project, otherwise known as the Guam HIV/AIDS Network.

The Coalition of Asia Pacific Regional Networks on HIV/AIDS (7 Sisters) 
Crisostomo later became the Executive Director of 7 Sisters, a broad-based alliance of regional Asia Pacific HIV/AIDS networks based in Thailand. He also served as UN AIDS Asia Pacific NGO Delegate from 2009 to 2010.

50-Plus Network 
Crisostomo currently facilitates the 50-Plus Network through the San Francisco AIDS Foundation. This network serves the gay, bi, and trans men community members who are 50 years or older in San Francisco through meetings twice a month and social gatherings.

Publications 
Crisostomo co-authored two academic papers on HIV AIDS.

 Wong et al. (2011) Development and implementation of a collaborative, multistakeholder research and practice model on HIV prevention targeting Asian/Pacific Islander men in the United States who have sex with men. Am J Public Health Apr 17;101(4):623-31
 Nemoto et al. (2003) HIV risk and prevention among Asian/Pacific Islander men who have sex with men: listen to our stories. AIDS Educ Prev Feb;15(1 Suppl A):7-20

References 

1961 births
Living people
HIV/AIDS activists
LGBT people from California
People from Tachikawa
Activists from California
Japanese emigrants to the United States
American LGBT people of Asian descent
Guamanian LGBT people
American LGBT people